Nupserha alexandrovi is a species of beetle in the family Cerambycidae. It was described by Nikolay Nikolaevich Plavilstshchikov in 1915.

References

alexandrovi
Beetles described in 1915